Walter Scammel was a medieval Bishop of Salisbury.

Scammel was archdeacon of Berkshire in the diocese of Salisbury, treasurer of that diocese, and finally Dean of Salisbury. He was elected to the deanery on 9 September 1271.

Scammel was elected bishop on 26 June 1284 and consecrated on 22 October 1284. He was enthroned at Salisbury Cathedral on 4 January 1285. He died between 20 September and 25 September 1286.

Citations

References
 Deans of Salisbury accessed on 30 October 2007
 

Bishops of Salisbury
Deans of Salisbury
Archdeacons of Berkshire
13th-century English Roman Catholic bishops
1286 deaths
Year of birth unknown